HOSA – Future Health Professionals, formerly known as Health Occupations Students of America (HOSA), is an international career and technical student organization (CTSO) endorsed by the U.S. Department of Education and the Health Science Technology Education Division of ACTE. HOSA is composed of middle school, secondary, and post-secondary/collegiate students, along with professional, alumni, and honorary members. It is headquartered in Southlake, Texas, and is the largest student organization that prepares students to enter the healthcare field, with membership in the United States, U.S. Territories, Canada, China, South Korea, and Mexico.

History

HOSA was founded in 1976 out of a task force from the American Vocational Association in order to determine whether a new student organization accommodating healthcare students was necessary.

From November 4–7, 1975, the State Department of Education and Division of Vocational Education in New Jersey with 18 representatives from Alabama, New Jersey, New Mexico, North Carolina, Oklahoma and Texas voted to form the American Health Occupations Education Student Organization.

On November 10–13, 1976, in a constitutional convention in Arlington, Texas AHOESO adopted bylaws, which also changed the organization's name to Health Occupations Students of America; elected national leaders; selected colors and a motto; made plans to design an emblem; and set the first National Leadership Conference for the spring of 1978 in Oklahoma City, Oklahoma.

In 2004, the organization dropped the acronym from its name, and began publishing all documents under the brand "HOSA – Future Health Professionals."

Chartered associations
, HOSA has grown to more than 50 chartered associations in several countries, including the United States and its territories, Canada, China, South Korea, and Mexico. HOSA's chartered associations are:

Mission statement

The mission of HOSA is to empower HOSA-Future Health Professionals to become leaders in the global health community through education, collaboration, and experience.

Uniform

The official HOSA uniform consists of a navy-blue suit with maroon accent in the form of a tie for men or a scarf for women. The HOSA emblem is affixed to the suit jacket.

International Leadership Conferences (ILCs)

Members meet annually at an International Leadership Conference held in late June in cities across the United States. Selected major cities for hosting the conference rotate every few years. Over 7,500 students participate in general sessions, competitive events, and leadership experiences, all while networking with health sciences students representing nearly all 50 states and countries including Canada, China, and Mexico.

Competitive events 

HOSA offers 82 competitive events, ranging from skill-based to leadership and team-based. The event groups are as follows: Health science, health professions, leadership, and recognition events. Members compete at the regional, state, and international levels. Those who place in the top three positions at the state level are given the opportunity to compete at the international level.

References

Bibliography

External links
 HOSA — national website

Career and technical student organizations